Jean Charles-Brun (29 December 1870 – 14 October 1946), was an Occitan French proponent of autonomy of France's regions and then founded the French Regionalist Federation in 1901. Charles-Brun was also a proponent of pan-Latinism and the creation of a democratic international "confederation latine" ("Latin Confederation").

References

External links
 

1870 births
1946 deaths
19th-century French people